Robert Powell (born 1 June 1944) is an English actor who is known for the title roles in Mahler (1974) and Jesus of Nazareth (1977), and for his portrayal of secret agent Richard Hannay in The Thirty Nine Steps (1978) and its subsequent spinoff television series. Other major screen roles have included Tobias "Toby" Wren in the BBC science-fiction programme Doomwatch (1970), David Briggs in the sitcom The Detectives (1993–1997) alongside Jasper Carrott, and Mark Williams in the medical drama Holby City (2005–2011).

His distinctive voice has become well known as a narrator of documentaries, especially in World War II documentaries including World War II in HD Colour, Hitler's Bodyguard, The Story of the Third Reich and Secrets of World War II.

Powell has been nominated for a BAFTA Award and won a Best Actor Award from the Venice Film Festival.

Early life
Powell was born in Salford, Lancashire, the son of Kathleen (née Davis) and John Wilson Powell. He was educated at Manchester Grammar School (then a direct grant grammar school), and studied law at the University of Manchester.

Career
Powell took up acting while an undergraduate, although he had already appeared as a teenager in The Adventures of Samuel Poppleton on BBC Radio Children's Hour from the North of England in Manchester, where he came under the guidance of producer, Trevor Hill, as detailed in Hill's autobiography, Over the Airwaves. He secured a post at a repertory theatre in Stoke-on-Trent. His first film part was in Robbery (1967), which starred Stanley Baker and was about the Great Train Robbery, in which he played the second man or locomotive driver's assistant. He had a small role in the original film version of The Italian Job (1969) playing one of the gang, but had to wait a few years for his first success, playing scientist Toby Wren in the BBC's science fiction series, Doomwatch in 1970.

Having been killed off in Doomwatch right at the end of Series One in a bomb explosion, at his request, Powell became a pin-up and a household name, following up with starring roles in several BBC serials, including television adaptations of the novels Sentimental Education (1970) and Jude the Obscure (1971). In 1972–1973 he portrayed Charles Rolls in the miniseries The Edwardians. He starred in the very first episode of the British series Thriller in 1973. He also appeared in the 1975 series Looking for Clancy, based on the Frederic Mullally novel Clancy.

For several years Powell continued as a television regular, with occasional forays into film, as the Austrian composer Gustav Mahler in the Ken Russell biopic Mahler (1974) and Captain Walker in Russell's film version of Tommy (1975). His role in Tommy had few lines, speaking only during the overture with Ann-Margret, he is primarily seen through the mind of his son as played by Barry Winch (Young Tommy) and Roger Daltrey.

He then played Jesus of Nazareth in Jesus of Nazareth (1977) following a successful second audition with Franco Zeffirelli. The four-part television film had an all-star cast, including Laurence Olivier as Nicodemus, Ernest Borgnine as the Roman Centurion, Stacy Keach as Barabbas, Christopher Plummer as Herod Antipas, Michael York as John the Baptist, Ian McShane as Judas Iscariot, Rod Steiger as Pontius Pilate and James Mason as Joseph of Arimathea. For this role, Powell was nominated for a BAFTA award, and collected the TVTimes Best Actor award for the same performance. His completist performance is frequently considered one of the best portrayals of Christ.

In 1978, Powell took the leading role of Richard Hannay in the third film version of The Thirty Nine Steps. It met with modest success, and critics compared Powell's portrayal of John Buchan's character favourably with those of his predecessors. His characterisation proved to be enduring, as almost ten years later a television series entitled simply Hannay appeared with Powell back in the role (although the Buchan short stories on which the series was based were set in an earlier period than The Thirty-Nine Steps). Hannay ran for two seasons.

In 1980, Powell appeared in the film Harlequin playing the Harlequin of the title, who seems to have the power to cure the son of a powerful politician. For this performance, he won the Best Actor Award at the Paris Film Festival. In 1982, he won Best Actor at the Venice Film Festival for his role in Imperativ.

In 1984, Powell made his U.S. film debut in What Waits Below (also known as Secrets of the Phantom Caverns).

In 1986, Powell narrated and co-starred in William C. Faure's miniseries Shaka Zulu, with Henry Cele in the title role. In 1992, he starred in the New Zealand World War I film Chunuk Bair, as Sgt Maj Frank Smith. In 1993–95, he was the voice actor of Dr Livesey in The Legends of Treasure Island.

Powell then agreed to a request from his friend and golf partner, comedian Jasper Carrott, taking the part of an incompetent detective in a succession of sketches that formed part of Carrott's television series. The Detectives proved to be popular and was later turned into a sitcom, Powell's first and only venture into this genre.

Powell's distinctive voice is frequently heard on voice-overs and as a narrator of television programmes such as Great Crimes and Trials, The Century of Warfare and World War II in HD Colour. He read the novel Love in the Time of Cholera by Gabriel García Márquez for BBC Radio 4's Book at Bedtime, and has also narrated many audio books including The Thirty Nine Steps, abridged versions of many of Alan Garner's books, and several abridged novels for The Talking Classics Collection. Powell has also lent his voice to musical works, such as David Bedford's album The Rime of the Ancient Mariner, or the 2002 rock opera The Hound of the Baskervilles, by Clive Nolan and Oliver Wakeman, where he played the role of John Watson. He also narrated on two rock albums by Rick Wakeman called Cost of Living and The Gospels (1987).

On 29 October 2001, a state-of-the-art theatre named after him was opened at the University of Salford. He became a patron of 24:7 Theatre Festival in 2004, and continues to operate in this capacity. In early 2005 he became a regular in the UK TV medical drama, Holby City, where he remained for six years before departing to return to theatre. On 9 February 2008, he performed as narrator in Prokofiev's Peter and the Wolf with the Huddersfield Philharmonic Orchestra with conductor Natalia Luis-Bassa in the North of England. In 2008–09, Powell was series announcer, (19 episodes), on BBC4's The Book Quiz.

In 2005 Powell began appearing in the BBC soap opera Holby City, as a hospital administrator. He said that regular employment in the series helped him make up financial losses caused by the failure of the pension fund he held with The Equitable Life Assurance Society.

On Easter Sunday 1 April 2018, he appeared in a Smithsonian Channel Documentary Series based on his portrayal of the Franco Zeffirelli mini-series Jesus of Nazareth titled, The Real Jesus of Nazareth, narrated by Judd Hirsch.  Based in Israel, it covered the life of Jesus juxtaposed with segments of the film series in which Powell starred in 1977. The characters who appeared in the film are also discussed and their historical significance uncovered. The series covered 4 segments, each one hour in length dealing with historical elements of the story along with Powell interviewing biblical historians such as Helen Bond and Candida Moss. The 1977 film starring Powell differed in at least two scenes from the Gospel's historical account: in the film, the Virgin Mary is shown without the angel of the Annunciation and Jesus carries only the horizontal branch of the Holy Cross to Calvary.

Personal life
Powell met his future wife, the Pan's People dancer Barbara "Babs" Lord, backstage at the BBC. In 1975, shortly before he was due to start filming for Jesus of Nazareth on location in Tunisia, the couple were married. On 23 November 1977, they had their son, Barney, followed in 1979 by a daughter, Kate.

The couple later took up sailing as a pastime. Babs Lord participated in the BT Global Yacht Challenge and the Polar race. Both took part, in different yachts, in a round-the-world race in 2000, though Powell himself was present for only one leg of the race.

Powell was a founder member of the Social Democratic Party in 1981, and campaigned alongside Barry Norman on behalf of the party's first leader, Roy Jenkins.

Filmography

Other work
In 1995, Powell was one of the readers of Edward Lear poems on a specially made spoken word audio CD bringing together a collection of Lear's nonsense songs.

He provided the narration for Clive Nolan and Oliver Wakeman’s 2002 adaptation of The Hound of the Baskervilles as a Progressive Rock album.

References

External links

 
 Robert Powell's Holby City profile at What's on TV

1944 births
Alumni of the University of Manchester
English male film actors
English male stage actors
English male television actors
English male voice actors
Living people
People educated at Manchester Grammar School
Male actors from Salford
20th-century English male actors
21st-century English male actors